XW or xw may refer to:

Language

 Xw, a digraph used in the Kurdish and the Tlingit language to represent : see List of Latin digraphs
 ⟨x̱w⟩, a digraph used in Alaskan Tlingit to represent : see List of Latin digraphs

Transportation

 XW GS, a model of Ford vehicle
 XW Falcon, a model of Ford vehicle
 XW, a model of PSA X automobile engine
 NokScoot (IATA airline code XW, 2014-2020)
 Sky Express (IATA airline code XW, 2006-2011)

Other uses

 X-wing, a Star Wars starfighter
 Crossword
 The World